Orom Stadium or Ir. Sutiyono Stadium is a football stadium in the town of Sungailiat, Bangka Regency, Bangka Belitung Islands, Indonesia. The stadium has a capacity of 7,000 people.

It is the home base of PS Bangka .

References

Sports venues in Indonesia
Football venues in Indonesia